Lydia Shouleva (born 23 December 1956 in Sofia) is a Bulgarian politician and Member of the European Parliament. She is a member of the National Movement Simeon II, part of the Alliance of Liberals and Democrats for Europe, and became an MEP on 1 January 2007 with the accession of Bulgaria to the European Union.

External links
European Parliament profile
European Parliament official photo

1956 births
Living people
People from Velingrad
Women government ministers of Bulgaria
National Movement for Stability and Progress MEPs
Deputy prime ministers of Bulgaria
Government ministers of Bulgaria
MEPs for Bulgaria 2007
Women MEPs for Bulgaria